Thai League 3 or Thailand Regional Championship, commonly known as the T3, is the third level of Thai football. It was started in 2017 First season. In 2017, the League is divided in 2 regions and participated by 32 clubs 1st-4th clubs from 8 regions which are former members Regional League Division 2 and debutants in the season.

History of Thai third-tier football

Division 2 era (until 2017)
A national third tier of Football Association of Thailand was first established  when the newly created Division 2 Football League  was formed in 2006 with 10 member clubs.

In 2006, the first season, 10 clubs played each other twice, with promotion going to the championship winner Chula-Sinthana FC. No relegation occurred in 2006.

In 2008, although two clubs were relegated at the end of the 2007 season, the league was again expanded the following year, to 22 clubs. 2 Groups would be created. 11 clubs in Group A and 11 clubs in Group B.

In 2009, Division 2 Football League renamed Regional League Division 2  Division 2 League was combined with Provincial League by FAT. The league was again split from 2 groups into 5 groups 52 clubs played covering the North of Thailand, North East (Isan) region, Central East Zone, Bangkok central zone and South of Thailand. The league was also renamed as the Regional League Division 2. 5 group winners would enter a championship round to determine which three teams would gain promotion to the Thai Division 1 League. Raj Pracha duly won the championship stage and were promoted with Chiangrai United of the Northern League and Narathiwat of the Southern League. 
The league was also created so it would combat against the rival Provincial League. With future growth moving the Pro League to join the 2nd Division.

Professionalization and establishment (2017)
Close to the end of 2016 about the upcoming professional third-tier league, referred to as either "Thai League 3" most of the sources agreed that the new league will feature around 32 clubs divided into Two Groups.

To participate a club must have held an associate membership, and then passed an inspection in order to obtain a participation licence issued by Football Association of Thailand and passed club licensing regulation.

Combined with Thai League 4 and change the season period (2020)
Due to the epidemic of Coronavirus disease 2019 also known as COVID-19, the season must be postponed to start in late 2020 and end in early 2021. In addition, the Thai League 4 had combined with the Thai League 3 and compete as Thai League 3 since this season.

Thai League 3 seasons
Here you can view the season's in more detail.

2017

2018

2019

2020–21
Due to the epidemic of Coronavirus disease 2019 also known as COVID-19, the season must be postponed to start in late 2020 and end in early 2021. In addition, the Thai League 4 had combined with the Thai League 3 and compete as Thai League 3 since this season and there is no relegation in this season.

2021–22

2022–23

Champions history

Champions of the 3rd tier Thai football league system

Sponsorship 
The list below details of the Thai League 3 sponsors have been and what they called the competition:

 2017: Euro Food (Euro Cake League Pro)
 2018–2021: Government Savings Bank (GSB League Pro in 2018–2020, GSB League Regional Championship in 2020–2021)
 2021–2022: Blue Dragon (Blue Dragon League)
 2022–2023: Kongsalakplus  (Kongsalakplus League)

See also 
 Football records in Thailand

References

External links
 official Thai League T3 rules

 
3
Sports leagues established in 2017
2017 establishments in Thailand
Third level football leagues in Asia
Professional sports leagues in Thailand